Harold Salt may refer to:

Harold Salt (British Army officer) (1879–1971), British Major-General 
Harold Salt (footballer), football player for Port Vale
Harry Salt (1899–1971), English football player